Kickoff '97 is a video game developed by Anco and published by Maxis for DOS and Windows.

Gameplay
Kickoff '97 is a soccer game that uses one button for shooting and one for passing, which can be combined for various actions.

Reception
Next Generation reviewed the PC version of the game, rating it four stars out of five, and stated that "the game is one of the most enjoyable soccer titles to hit the PC."

Chris Macholtz for the Arizona Daily Star called the game "no timeless classic, but it does stand on its own merits as being a game with absolutely no learning curve or complexity to it".

Reviews
PC Gamer #4 (9) 1997 September
Computer Gaming World #159 (Oct 1997)
Edge #44
PC Player (Germany) - Apr, 1997
PC Games - Apr, 1997
GameSpot (Jul 17, 1997)
The Adrenaline Vault (AVault) (Sep 29, 1997)
Gamesmania.de (1997)

References

1997 video games
Anco Software games
Association football video games
DOS games
Maxis games
Multiplayer and single-player video games
Video games developed in the United Kingdom
Windows games